Farm to Market Roads in Texas are owned and maintained by the Texas Department of Transportation (TxDOT).

FM 1700

FM 1701

FM 1702

FM 1703

Farm to Market Road 1703 (FM 1703) is located in Brewster County.

The southern terminus of FM 1703 is at US 67/US 90 in Alpine. The route travels west and then north before state maintenance ends.

FM 1703 was designated on September 27, 1960, on its current route.

FM 1703 (1951)

FM 1703 was first designated on July 25, 1951, as a route in Lynn County. The route was cancelled on February 3, 1960, and its mileage was transferred to FM 212.

FM 1704

FM 1704 is located in Bastrop County. It runs from Loop 109 in Elgin southward across US 290 to FM 969.

FM 1704 was designated on May 23, 1951, from Loop 109 southward . The extension to FM 969 was approved on December 17, 1952.

FM 1705

FM 1705 (1951)

FM 1705 was cancelled on December 17, 1952, with its mileage transferred to an extension of FM 916.

FM 1706

FM 1707

FM 1707 (1951)

FM 1707 was previously designated as a route in Parker County. The route was extended  to Silver Creek on December 17, 1952. FM 1707 was extended  to a road intersection on October 29, 1953. The road was extended to SH 199 in Azle on June 28, 1955. This route was cancelled on December 20, 1984, with the mileage being transferred to FM 730.

FM 1708

FM 1709

FM 1710

FM 1711

Farm to Market Road 1711 (FM 1711) is located in Throckmorton County. The road begins east of Throckmorton at an intersection with US 380, and continues north intersecting with SH 79 until it ends at a county road north of Elbert.

FM 1711 was designated on May 23, 1951, running from SH 79 in Elbert north  to a road intersection. On August 24, 1955, FM 1711 was extended south . On November 21, 1956, FM 1711 was extended south to SH 24 (now US 380).

Junction list

FM 1712

FM 1712 (1951)

FM 1712 was previously designated as a route in Hartley County. Part of FM 1712 was transferred to FM 281 on December 7, 1953. The route was cancelled on December 18, 1959, with the mileage being transferred to FM 807.

FM 1713

FM 1713 (1951)

This highway was cancelled on November 29, 1957, with the mileage being transferred to FM 1454.

FM 1714

FM 1715

Farm to Market Road 1715 (FM 1715) is located in Lampasas County. The road begins at FM 580 outside of Lampasas and continues east until ending at US 190 east of Lampasas.

The current FM 1715 was designated on July 29, 1993, from US 190 northward . On June 27, 1995, FM 1715 was extended west to FM 580.

FM 1715 (1951)

The route was cancelled on December 17, 1952, with the mileage being transferred to FM 348. The old route of FM 348 became part of FM 1798.

FM 1715 (1952)

On September 20, 1961, he highway was extended  westward to the end of FM 2463. On October 3, 1961, the road was extended to SH 108, absorbing FM 2463 in the process. FM 1715 was cancelled on December 20, 1984, with the mileage being transferred to FM 1188.

FM 1716

FM 1716 (May 1951)

The first use of FM 1716 was in Rusk County, from FM 225 at Laneville northwest to FM 839. Six months later FM 1716 was cancelled and became a portion of FM 95.

FM 1716 (December 1951)

The second use of FM 1716 was in Hopkins County, from SH 154 east to Reilly Springs. FM 1716 was cancelled on December 17, 1952, and transferred to FM 1567.

FM 1716 (1952)

The third use of FM 1716 was in Erath County, from SH 108 at Huckabay southwest  to a road intersection. FM 1716 was cancelled on October 25, 1954, and became a portion of FM 219.

FM 1717

FM 1717 (1951)

The original FM 1717 was designated on May 23, 1951, from FM 782 near Oak Hill northeast to SH 149. FM 1717 was cancelled on July 9, 1952, and transferred to FM 782.

FM 1718

Farm to Market Road 1718 (FM 1718) is located in Johnson County. It runs from SH 171 at Cleburne southwest to Harvest Hill Road.

FM 1718 was designated on July 30, 1964, from SH 171 at Cleburne southwest to Cleburne Reservoir as a replacement of a section of FM 1434. On December 15, 2005, a 0.2 mile section from Harvest Hill Road to Cleburne Reservoir was removed from the highway system and turned over to the city of Cleburne.

FM 1718 (1951)

The original FM 1718 was designated on May 23, 1951, from RM 87 (now SH 176), 4 miles east of SH 137, north  to a road intersection. On September 29, 1954, the road was extended northwest  to the Dawson County line. On October 26, 1954, a  section from the Dawson County line to SH 349 was added. On September 2, 1960, the road was extended to US 180, replacing a section of FM 1064. FM 1718 was cancelled on October 10, 1961, and transferred to FM 829.

FM 1719

FM 1719 (May 1951)

The original FM 1719 was designated on May 23, 1951, from US 87 in Boerne southwest to the Bandera County line. Two months later FM 1719 was cancelled and became a part of FM 475.

FM 1720

Farm to Market Road 1720 (FM 1720) is located in Haskell County. It runs from SH 24 to SH 222.

FM 1720 was designated on December 17, 1952, from SH 24 9 miles west of Throckmorton, northwest 6 miles. On October 28, 1953, FM 1720 was extended northwest 6.5 miles to a road intersection. On September 29, 1954, FM 1720 was extended west to US 277 at Weinert. On September 5, 1973, the section from FM 266 to US 380 was signed (but not designated) as part of SH 222. On August 29, 1990, this section was officially redesignated as part of SH 222.

FM 1720 (May 1951)

The original FM 1720 was designated on May 23, 1951, from US 87 (now FM 1223) 1 mile east of US 277 east . FM 1720 was cancelled on November 28, 1951, and transferred to FM 765.

FM 1720 (December 1951)

The next FM 1720 was designated from SH 154 west to Arbala and north to a road intersection  from SH 154. FM 1720 was cancelled on December 17, 1952, and transferred to FM 1567.

FM 1721

FM 1721 (1951)

The original FM 1721 was designated on May 23, 1951, from SH 29, 5 miles south of Cuero, to Arneckeville. On November 20, 1951, FM 1721 was eliminated; FM 236 was extended instead.

FM 1722

FM 1722 (1951)

The original FM 1722 was designated on May 23, 1951, from FM 682, 1 mile west of Terryville, southwest to Stratton. FM 1722 was cancelled on January 17, 1952, and transferred to FM 1447.

RM 1723

 It was originally FM 1723 from 1951 to 1956.

FM 1724

FM 1725

FM 1726

FM 1727

FM 1727 (1951)

The original FM 1727 was designated on May 23, 1951, from SH 35 west via Blessing to the Jackson County line. FM 1727 was cancelled on November 12, 1954, and became a portion of FM 616.

FM 1728

FM 1729

FM 1730

FM 1731

FM 1732

FM 1732 (1951)

The original FM 1732 was designated on May 23, 1951, from SH 21 at Austonio west to Ash. FM 1732 was cancelled on December 17, 1956, and became a portion of FM 1280.

FM 1733

FM 1734

FM 1735

FM 1736

Farm to Market Road 1736 (FM 1736) is located in Waller County. It runs from US 290 to FM 1488.

FM 1736 was designated on May 23, 1951, from US 290 northwest of Hempstead north and east to SH 6 north of Hempstead. On September 20, 1961, the road was extended east  to FM 1488. On May 2, 1962, the eastern terminus was relocated south, lengthening the route by 1.8 miles.

FM 1737

FM 1738

FM 1738 (1951)

The original FM 1738 was designated on May 23, 1951, from FM 118 at Jacobia north and east  to a county road. FM 1738 was cancelled on December 17, 1952, and transferred to FM 118.

FM 1739

FM 1740

Farm to Market Road 1740 (FM 1740) is located in Wichita and Clay counties. It begins at FM 171 just outside of Wichita Falls and runs northeastward along Lower Charlie Road to an intersection with FM 810.

FM 1740 was designated on May 23, 1951, running from FM 171  to the Clay County line. The highway was extended  to a road intersection on December 17, 1952. FM 1740 was extended to its current eastern terminus at FM 810 on August 24, 1955.

Junction list

FM 1741

Farm to Market Road 1741 (FM 1741) is located in Temple, where it is known locally as 31st Street.

FM 1741 begins at an intersection with FM 93 near the southern edge of the city. The highway travels in a slight northeast direction and travels through suburban areas of the city before passing through a major retail center near US 190/SH 36/Loop 363. FM 1741 passes by a major medical center and travels just east of I-35 before ending at an intersection with SH 53 about a mile west of downtown Temple.

The highway was extended  to Avenue H in Temple on May 2, 1962. The section of FM 1741 between US 81 and FM 2618 was realigned and transferred to FM 93 on January 31, 1974, along with FM 2618 itself. The northern terminus of the highway was extended to SH 53 on November 29, 1990. On June 27, 1995, the entire route was redesignated Urban Road 1741 (UR 1741). The designation reverted to FM 1741 with the elimination of the Urban Road system on November 15, 2018.

Junction list

FM 1741 (1951)

The highway was extended  southward on November 11, 1951. FM 1741 was cancelled on April 29, 1952, with the mileage being transferred to FM 1231.

FM 1742

FM 1742 (1951)

The first use of FM 1742 was designated on May 23, 1951, in Coryell County, from Spur 18 at Oglesby to SH 236 north of Mother Neff State Park. On November 20, 1951, the road was extended to SH 317, replacing part of SH 236. FM 1742 was cancelled on February 20, 1952, and transferred to FM 107.

FM 1742 (1952)

The second use of FM 1742 was designated on February 21, 1952, in Martin County, from SH 137 at Flower Grove east and south to FM 846. On January 29, 1953, a  section from SH 137 to FM 2002 was transferred to FM 2002. FM 1742 was cancelled on April 9, 1953, and transferred to FM 26.

FM 1743

FM 1743 (1951)

On January 15, 1952, FM 1743 was cancelled and transferred to FM 221.

FM 1744

FM 1745

FM 1746

FM 1747

FM 1748

FM 1748 (1951)

The original FM 1748 was designated on May 23, 1951, from US 83 at Guion to FM 688, 1 mile west of Lawn. FM 1748 was cancelled on February 20, 1952, and transferred to FM 604.

FM 1749

Farm to Market Road 1749 (FM 1749) is a two-lane highway that connects the farming areas near Forestburg with SH 101 at Sunset in far south central Montague County.

FM 1749 runs from SH 101 in Sunset to FM 455 near Forestburg.

The highway was extended  to FM 455 on May 6, 1964.

FM 1749 (May 1951)

The route was cancelled on October 9, 1951, with the mileage being transferred to FM 613.

FM 1749 (October 1951)

FM 1749 was designated again on October 16, 1951, running from US 81 (now SH 132) in Lytle to the community of Bexar. On April 21, 1953, the route was extended east to Somerset. The route was cancelled on May 25, 1953, with the mileage being transferred to FM 1518.

FM 1749 (1953)

FM 1749 was designated a third time on June 25, 1953, running from US 290 (now SH 290) at Sheffield  to the Terrell county line. The highway was extended  on October 29, 1953. FM 1749 was cancelled on September 29, 1954, with the mileage being transferred to FM 1217 (now SH 349).

FM 1750

FM 1751

FM 1751 (1951)

The original FM 1751 was designated on May 23, 1951, from SH 78, 2.5 miles west of Leonard, south to the Collin County line. FM 1751 was cancelled on April 7, 1953, and transferred to FM 981.

FM 1752

FM 1753

FM 1754

FM 1755

FM 1756

FM 1757

FM 1757 (1951)

The original FM 1757 was designated on May 23, 1951, from FM 1756, 1.5 miles west of Truscott, south to a county road. On February 19, 1952, FM 1757 was cancelled in exchange for extending FM 1756 west 1.3 miles from its previous terminus.

FM 1758

Farm to Market Road 1758 (FM 1758) is located in Montague County.

It travels in a southwesterly direction for  before state maintenance ends near Salona in unincorporated Montague County.

It was extended to its current length on May 7, 1970.

FM 1759

Farm to Market Road 1759 (FM 1759) is located in Montague County.

FM 1759 begins at an intersection with FM 103 in Nocona, heading west-southwest on two-lane undivided West Pine Street. The road heads through residential areas, curving west and heading between American Legion Park to the north and Nocona Cemetery to the south. The highway turns north and leaves Nocona, then curves to the west and intersects FM 3394. The road turns to the north again before reaching its northern terminus at an intersection with White and Briddy Road, where the road continues north as Gray Road.

FM 1759 was first designated on May 23, 1951, running from FM 103 to an intersection  to the northwest. The highway was extended  on November 24, 1959. On May 2, 1967, FM 1759 was extended to its current terminus.

FM 1760

FM 1761

FM 1762

FM 1763

FM 1764

Farm to Market Road 1764 (FM 1764) is located in Galveston County. It runs from SH 6 in Santa Fe to 14th Street in Texas City. There are brief concurrencies with FM 2004 and I-45.

FM 1764 was designated on May 23, 1951, from the then-new route of US 75 (now I-45) and Camp Wallace Road east to SH 146. On December 17, 1952, the road was extended west  to SH 6. On November 21, 1956, the road was extended 2.3 miles east to 14th Street in Texas City. On October 16, 1989, a gap in the route was added at the I-45/FM 2004 intersection. On June 27, 1995, the entire route was redesignated Urban Road 1764 (UR 1764). The designation reverted to FM 1764 with the elimination of the Urban Road system on November 15, 2018.

FM 1765

Farm to Market Road 1765 (FM 1765) is located in Galveston County. It runs from FM 2004 in La Marque to Loop 197 in Texas City. The road is known locally as Texas Avenue.

FM 1765 was designated on May 23, 1951, from SH 6 west of Hitchcock north and east to the then-old route of US 75 (now SH 3). On December 17, 1952, a  section from SH 6 to FM 2004 was transferred to FM 2004. On November 29, 1990, the road was extended to Loop 197 (now Spur 197), replacing SH 348. On June 27, 1995, the entire route was redesignated Urban Road 1765 (UR 1765). The designation reverted to FM 1765 with the elimination of the Urban Road system on November 15, 2018.

FM 1766

FM 1766 (1951)

The original FM 1766 was designated on May 23, 1951, from US 277 in Eldorado northwest  to a road intersection. On November 20, 1951, the road was extended northwest another . On December 17, 1952, the road was extended northwest  to the Irion County line. FM 1766 was cancelled on January 23, 1953, and transferred to FM 915.

FM 1767

FM 1767 (May 1951)

The first use of FM 1767 was in Comanche County, from SH 36, 4 miles east of Gustine north and west  via Hazeldell to a road intersection. FM 1767 was cancelled on December 12, 1951, and became a portion of FM 591.

FM 1767 (December 1951)

The second use of FM 1767 was in Rains and Wood counties, from SH 19, 6 miles north of Emory, east  to a road intersection. On October 27, 1953, the road was extended east  to FM 17, replacing FM 2089. FM 1767 was cancelled on December 21, 1959, and transferred to FM 514.

FM 1768

FM 1769

FM 1770

FM 1771

FM 1772

RM 1773

 It was originally FM 1773 from 1951 to 1959.

FM 1773 (1951)

The original FM 1773 was designated on August 22, 1951, from US 59 (now Loop 494) at New Caney east to the Harris County line. This designation was short-lived as FM 1773 became a portion of FM 1485 on September 27, 1951. Given that the original FM 1773 and the current FM 1773 existed at the same time for a short time, it is likely that one of them was supposed to be numbered FM 793.

FM 1774

Farm to Market Road 1774 (FM 1774) is located in Grimes, Waller and Montgomery counties. It runs from SH 90 at Anderson to FM 149 at Pinehurst.

FM 1774 was designated on August 22, 1951, from FM 149 at Pinehurst northwest via Magnolia to the Grimes County line. On December 17, 1952, the road was extended northwest  to SH 105 at Plantersville. On October 27, 1954, the road was extended northwest to SH 90 at Anderson, replacing FM 1369. On May 1, 1963, the route was modified to show a gap at FM 1488. In December 2019 the road was extended south to Woodtrace Boulevard and SH 249, replacing a section of SH 249, but this was modified in a June 25, 2020, so that FM 1774 was extended only over the frontage roads from new SH 249 to Woodtrace Boulevard (FM 1774 still replaced the entire section from FM 149 to SH 249) while the main lanes retain the SH 249 designation.

FM 1775

FM 1776

FM 1776 (1951)

The first use of FM 1776 was in San Augustine and Sabine counties, from SH 21 at Ford's Corner south to SH 184 at Bronson. This was formerly a section of US 96. On October 14, 1954, FM 1776 was cancelled and became a portion of FM 1.

FM 1776 (1955)

The next use of FM 1776 was in Grimes County, from FM 149 at Richards, southeast to the Montgomery County line, with a future extension to Dacus. On September 21, 1955, the road was officially extended to Dacus. FM 1776 was cancelled two months later and transferred to FM 1486.

FM 1777

Farm to Market Road 1777 (FM 1777) connects the towns of Royse City and Josephine in southeastern Collin County.

FM 1777 begins at an intersection with SH 66 in Royse City and runs through mostly rural farm land before ending at an intersection with FM 6 in Josephine.

The highway was extended  to FM 6 on April 29, 1952.

FM 1778

Farm to Market Road 1778 (FM 1778) is located in Collin County.

FM 1778 begins at an intersection with Bus. SH 78 in Copeville near Lavon Lake. The highway runs in an eastern direction and runs along the northern boundary of Nevada where it intersects FM 1138. FM 1778 continues to run east before ending at an intersection with FM 547 near Josephine.

FM 1778 was designated on September 19, 1951, running from SH 78 (now Bus. The highway was extended  to FM 547 on October 31, 1957.

FM 1779

FM 1780

Farm to Market Road 1780 (FM 1780) is located in the South Plains region of West Texas. The highway begins at an intersection with SH 83 just west of Seagraves and runs in a generally north direction, ending at SH 214 in Morton. The highway runs parallel to SH 214, acting as an alternate route to that highway between Denver City and Morton.

The route of FM 1780 is mostly rural, with Whiteface and Morton as the only towns along the highway's route.

The highway enters Yoakum County just north of here and has intersections with FM 1939 and FM 213. The highway's next intersection is with FM 2196, entering Cochran County north of here. FM 1780 has an intersection with FM 301 west of Sundown before sharing a brief overlap with FM 1585. The highway meets FM 300 before entering the town of Whiteface. In Morton, FM 1780 serves as the eastern terminus for SH 125 and has a brief overlap with SH 114 along the town's northern boundary. The highway continues to run north before turning west at County Road 245. FM 1780 continues to run in a generally west direction before reaching its northern terminus at SH 214 in Morton.

FM 1780 was first designated on July 25, 1951, running from SH 290 (current SH 114) in Morton to SH 290 (current SH 114) in Whiteface. On October 16, 1951, the west end was changed to SH 214 in Morton. The highway was extended further south along the old route of FM 769 from SH 116 (current SH 114) to FM 301, and on a new route south to FM 2196 on September 21, 1955. On September 27, 1960, FM 1780 was extended south to US 380. On September 15, 1976, FM 1780 was extended further south to its current southern terminus at SH 83, absorbing FM 1544 and parts of FM 1939.

Junction list

FM 1781

FM 1782

FM 1782 (1951)

The original FM 1782 was designated on July 25, 1951, from SH 22 in Blooming Grove northwest  to a road intersection. FM 1782 was cancelled on November 28, 1958, and transferred to FM 55.

FM 1783

FM 1783 (May 1951)

The original FM 1783 was designated on May 23, 1951, from US 281 at Scotland east  to the Clay County line. FM 1783 was cancelled on November 20, 1951, and transferred to FM 172.

FM 1784

FM 1785

FM 1785 (1951)

The original FM 1785 was designated on September 19, 1951, from US 281 at Campbellton northeast  to a road intersection. FM 1785 was cancelled on October 28, 1953, and transferred to FM 791.

FM 1786

FM 1786 (1951)

The original FM 1786 was designated on September 19, 1951, from FM 140 in Charlotte north to SH 173. FM 1786 was cancelled on January 31, 1952, and transferred to FM 1333.

FM 1787

Farm to Market Road 1787 (FM 1787) is located in rural parts of southern Ector and Midland counties.

FM 1787 begins at an intersection with US 385 near the Pleasant Farms and Nolan Acres subdivisions. The highway travels in a predominately northeast direction and ends at an intersection with SH 349.

Junction list

FM 1788

Farm to Market Road 1788 (FM 1788) is located in West Texas. FM 1788 carries the La Entrada al Pacifico Corridor from its intersection with Interstate 20 (I-20) to SH 349. FM 1788 is locally known as Telephone Road in Andrews and Gaines counties.

FM 1788 was designated on July 25, 1951, from FM 1787 southward . On February 24, 1953, FM 1788 was extended north  to US 80 (now supplanted by I-20). On September 20, 1961, FM 1788 was extended north to SH 158. On May 2, 1962, FM 1788 was extended north to FM 87 (now SH 176). On June 2, 1967, FM 1788 was extended north  to a road intersection. On January 31, 2008, FM 1788 was extended north along Telephone Road to the Andrews-Gaines county line. On March 25, 2010, FM 1788 was extended north along Telephone Road and west along CR 402 to US 385.

Junction list

FM 1789

FM 1790

Farm to Market Road 1790 (FM 1790) is located in Baylor County. Its southern terminus is at SH 114 southeast of Seymour. It runs to the north, meeting FM 2180 at that route's eastern terminus, before intersecting with FM 422. The two routes briefly run concurrently to the west before FM 1790 resumes its northward routing, reaching its northern terminus at US 82/US 183/US 277/US 283.

FM 1790 was designated on September 18, 1951, from Mabelle to FM 422. It was extended to SH 114 (then SH 199) on October 18, 1954, replacing FM 1874.

FM 1791

FM 1792

Farm to Market Road 1792 (FM 1792) was located in Cameron County. No highway currently uses the FM 1792 designation.

The highway was extended  to SH 100 at Port Isabel on November 20, 1951. On February 28, 1973, FM 1792 was signed (but not designated) as SH 48. FM 1792 was cancelled on August 29, 1990, as the SH 48 designation became official.

FM 1793

FM 1794

Farm to Market Road 1794 (FM 1794) is located in Panola County. It runs from FM 959 east of Tatum to FM 31 in DeBerry.

On June 1, 1965, it was extended west  to SH 43 in Tatum. On November 24, 1970, FM 1794 was extended east along a portion of old US 59 to FM 1186 and onward to FM 31 in DeBerry, replacing FM 2792. FM 1794 was truncated to FM 959 on April 30, 2015; the  section from FM 959 to SH 43 was removed from the highway system and sold to a mining company, becoming a private road.

FM 1795

FM 1796

FM 1796 (November 1951)

The original FM 1796 was designated on November 20, 1951, from US 60 at Bovina north  to a road intersection. FM 1796 was cancelled on January 14, 1952, and transferred to FM 1731.

FM 1797

FM 1798

FM 1799

Notes

References

+17
Farm to market roads 1700
Farm to Market Roads 1700